KBOY-FM (95.7 MHz) is a radio station broadcasting a classic rock music format. Licensed to Medford, Oregon, United States, the station serves the Medford-Ashland area. The station is currently owned by Stephens Media Group, through licensee SMG Medford, LLC.

Translators
KBOY-FM broadcasts on the following translator:

References

External links
Official Website

BOY-FM
Medford, Oregon
Classic rock radio stations in the United States
Radio stations established in 1959
1959 establishments in Oregon